Dameron or sometimes spelled Damron is a surname with the following notable people:

 Tadd Dameron, noted jazz musician
 Dick Damron, Canadian country music singer
 Robert Damron, American professional golfer

Fictional characters
 Kes Dameron, a Rebel sergeant in the comic miniseries Star Wars: Shattered Empire
 Poe Dameron, Kes' son and Resistance pilot in the sequel era of the Star Wars universe

External links
 The Dameron/Damron Family Association webpage